Salvatore Nistico (April 2, 1940 – March 3, 1991) was an American jazz tenor saxophonist.

Career 
Associated for many years with Woody Herman's Herd, Nistico played in the group from 1962 to 1965, considered one of Herman's best bands, with Bill Chase, Jake Hanna, Nat Pierce, and Phil Wilson.

He started playing alto saxophone, switching to tenor in 1956, on a Buescher before switching to a Conn 10M tenor saxophone, and briefly played baritone saxophone. From 1959 to 1961, he played with the Jazz Brothers band (Chuck Mangione and Gap Mangione).
 
In 1965, he joined Count Basie but returned on many occasions to play with Herman. Around that time he was also a member of Dusko Goykovich's sextet with other musicians associated with the Herd, such as Carl Fontana, Nat Pierce, and Michael Moore. He also played with Nat Adderley, Don Ellis, Buddy Rich, and Stan Tracey.
Living in Europe in his latter years he worked with mostly European musicians as Joe Haider, Isla Eckinger, Billy Brooks, Fritz Pauer and recorded with the Larry Porter/ Allan Praskin Band and Three Generations Of Tenor saxophone with Johnny Griffin, Roman Schwaller, Paul Grabowsky, Roberto DiGioia, Thomas Stabenow, Joris Dudli and Mario Gonzi. The first live performance from January 1985 was released under the band's name on JHM Records Switzerland.

Nistico's solo work contrasts his big band work. His solo work is more oriented towards bebop, as heard on the Heavyweights recording on Riverside Records.

Discography

As leader or co-leader
 1961: Heavyweights (Milestone)
 1962: Comin' On Up (Milestone)
 1978: East of Isar, The Sal Nistico-Benny Bailey Quintet (Ego)
 1978: Neo/Nistico (Bee Hive)
 1981: Woody Herman Presents, Vol. 2: Four Others Al Cohn, Sal Nistico, Bill Perkins, Flip Phillips (Concord Jazz)
 1981: Live at Carmelo's 1981 (Fresh Sound)
 1985: Three Generations Of Tenorsaxophone, Johnny Griffin-Sal Nistico-Roman Schwaller (JHM Records Switzerland, JHM 3611, released 1997)
 1988: Empty Room (RED Distribution)
 1995: Sal Nistico Live (Culture Press)
 2001: Jazz Friends with Tullio De Piscopo (Amiata)
 2010: Swiss Radio Days, Vol. 21 with Tony Scott (TCB)

As sideman or guest
With Chet Baker
 1992: Live at Renaissance II (CD Baby)
 1994: Nightbird (CLA)
 1997: In a Soulful Mood (Music Club)
 2001: Round Midnight (Fruit Tree)

With Count Basie
2005: NEA Jazz Masters–Count Basie (Verve)

With Sammy Davis, Jr. & Count Basie
 1965: Our Shining Hour (Verve)

With Curtis Fuller
1978: Fire and Filigree (Bee Hive)

With Woody Herman
 1963: Woody Herman–1963 (Philips)
 1963: Encore Woody Herman–1963
 1964: Woody Herman–1964 (Philips)
 1965: The Swinging Herman Herd-Recorded Live (Philips)
 1965: Woody's Big Band Goodies (Philips)
 1969: Woody Herman – Light My Fire (Cadet)
 1992: World Class (Concord Jazz)
 1994: Live at Newport & At the Hollywood Bowl (Jazz Band)

With The Jazz Brothers (Chuck & Gap)
 1960: The Jazz Brothers (Riverside)
 1961: Hey Baby! (Riverside)
 1961: Spring Fever (Riverside)

With Helen Merrill
 1980: Casa Forte (Mercury)

With Pony Poindexter
 1962: Pony's Express (Epic)

With Larry Porter-Allan Praskin Quartet
 1994: Sonnet for Sal (Enja)

With Buddy Rich
 1974: Very Live at Buddy's Place (LRC)
 1974: Transition Buddy Rich & Lionel Hampton (Groove Merchant)
 1989: Tuff Dude (LRC)

With Sarah Vaughan
1984: The Mystery of Man (Kokopelli)
 Source

References

1938 births
1991 deaths
American jazz tenor saxophonists
American male saxophonists
Musicians from Syracuse, New York
Riverside Records artists
American people of Italian descent
20th-century American saxophonists
Jazz musicians from New York (state)
20th-century American male musicians
American male jazz musicians